Valeriy Viktorovych Chybineyev (3 March 1988 – 3 March 2022) was a Ukrainian sniper who served as commander of the sniper company of the 79th Air Assault Brigade. He fought in the war in Donbas and was awarded the Order of the Gold Star (Hero of Ukraine) in 2016 for his actions during a combat mission in Avdiivka. On his 34th birthday, Chybineyev was killed in the Battle of Hostomel during the 2022 Russian invasion of Ukraine.

Early life and education 
Chybineyev was born on 3 March 1988 in Berdiansk. His parents died while he was young and he was subsequently raised in an orphanage. He was influenced by the son of the orphanage's director who was a paratrooper. Chybineyev attended the Zaporizhzhya Regional Military Sports Lyceum Zakhisnik before graduating from the Odessa Military Academy.

Military career 
In 2010, Chybineyev became a lieutenant and joined the 79th Air Assault Brigade.

In another instance, he helped rescue three soldiers inside a tank that had hit a land mine. To avoid being taken captive, Chybineyev once claimed to be part of Russian-backed forces. In January 2015, he was one of the soldiers who fought in the Second Battle of Donetsk Airport.

In 2016, Chybineyev became the commander of the sniper company of the 79th Air Assault Brigade. In July 2016, he led sniper teams during a combat mission near Avdiivka. The unit successfully destroyed all twelve targets, including machine guns, grenade launchers, and snipers.

Chybineyev was injured when a shell fragment lodged in his shoulder. He continued to lead the unit. For his actions, he was honoured with the Order of the Gold Star by President Petro Poroshenko during the Independence Day of Ukraine parade on Khreshchatyk street.
He was subsequently promoted to major.

While fighting during the 2022 Russian invasion of Ukraine, Chybineyev was killed in action in the Battle of Hostomel on 3 March 2022, his 34th birthday.

Personal life 
In December 2016, Chybineyev was named by the Kyiv Post as one of the "Top 30 Under 30" young leaders in Ukraine. In a subsequent interview, he stated that he wanted to establish a sniper school.

His brother Roman Chybineyev, the commander of a platoon within the 79th Brigade, died in 2019.

References

External links

1988 births
2022 deaths
Odesa Military Academy alumni
Paratroopers
People from Berdiansk
Recipients of the Order of Gold Star (Ukraine)
Ukrainian military personnel killed in the 2022 Russian invasion of Ukraine
Ukrainian military personnel of the war in Donbas
Ukrainian military snipers